Quercus ungeri is a species of flowering plant in the family Fagaceae, native to north-west Iran. It was first described by Theodor Kotschy  in 1858.  It is placed in Quercus section Cerris.

References

ungeri
Flora of Iran
Plants described in 1858